Adèle Caby-Livannah (born 1957) is a writer from the Republic of the Congo. From 1983 on she was a school librarian in Mante, France. She is primarily a short fiction writer with at least two collections.

References

1957 births
Living people
Republic of the Congo writers
Republic of the Congo women short story writers
Republic of the Congo women writers
Place of birth missing (living people)
Date of birth missing (living people)